The Moldova men's national under-16 basketball team is a national basketball team of Moldova, administered by the Basketball Federation of Moldova. It represents the country in international men's under-16 basketball competitions.

The team won two bronze medals at the FIBA U16 European Championship Division C in 2008 and 2016.

FIBA U16 European Championship participations

See also
Moldova men's national basketball team
Moldova men's national under-18 basketball team
Moldova women's national under-16 basketball team

References

External links
Archived records of Moldova team participations

Basketball in Moldova
Basketball
Men's national under-16 basketball teams